The Norwegian Military Tattoo (Norsk Militær Tattoo) is a military festival held biannually in the Norwegian capital of Oslo. It is organized by the Forsvarets musikk, the department that oversees all the country's military bands (musikkorps). The first tattoo was held in 1994 in Hamar, which is north of Oslo. The tattoo has been held in the Oslo Spektrum since 1996. It features military bands and drill teams of the Norwegian Armed Forces (such as the band and honour guard of Hans Majestet Kongens Garde) as well as the bands and drill teams of foreign countries.

With over 800 participants on stage, the Norwegian Military Tattoo is Norway's largest indoor show. The tattoo's official TV partner is NRK1. The director of the Norwegian Military Tattoofrom 1995 to 2014 was Colonel Christer Johannesen, a former music inspector in the Armed Forces.

Notable participants
For a complete overwiev, please visit: Norsk Militær Tattoo
Queen's Colour Squadron
United States Army Field Band
Old Guard Fife and Drum Corps
Fanfare Band of the Royal Marechaussee
Staff Band of the Bundeswehr
Wachbataillon Drill Team
United States Air Force Honor Guard Drill Team
Republic of Korea Armed Forces Traditional Daechwita Band
Oslo Philharmonic Choir
New Guard America

External links
Official Website

References 

Music festivals established in 1994
1994 establishments in Norway
Annual events in Norway
Military of Norway
Music festivals in Norway
Military tattoos